Knudtzon is a surname. Notable people with the surname include:
Annelise Knudtzon (1914–2006), Norwegian textile artist
Birger Knudtzon (born 1936), retired Norwegian rower
Broder Knudtzon (1788–1864), Norwegian merchant, politician and benefactor
Erling Knudtzon (born 1988), Norwegian football midfielder
Hans Carl Knudtzon (1751–1823), Norwegian merchant, ship-owner and politician
Jørgen Alexander Knudtzon (1854–1917), Norwegian linguist and historian
Jørgen von Cappelen Knudtzon (1784–1854), Norwegian businessman and patron of the arts
Leif Knudtzon (1895–1925), Norwegian modern pentathlete
Nic Knudtzon (1922–2013), Norwegian telecommunications engineer

See also
Knutzon